Pterygia is a genus of sea snails, marine gastropod mollusks in the subfamily Cylindromitrinae of the family Mitridae.

Species
Species within the genus Pterygia include:

 Pterygia arctata 
 Pterygia conus 
 Pterygia crenulata 
 Pterygia dactylus 
 Pterygia deburghiae  (taxon inquirendum)
 Pterygia fenestrata 
 Pterygia glans  (taxon inquirendum)
 Pterygia gorii 
 Pterygia japonica 
 Pterygia jeanjacquesi 
 Pterygia morrisoni 
 Pterygia nucea 
 Pterygia purtymuni 
 Pterygia scabricula 
 Pterygia sinensis 
 Pterygia undulosa 

Species brought into synonymy
 Pterygia barrywilsoni : synonym of Scabricola barrywilsoni  (original combination)
 Pterygia denticulata : synonym of Glabella denticulata 
 Pterygia edentula  synonym of Nebularia edentula 
 Pterygia erminea : synonym of Glabella faba 
 Pterygia gilbertsoni  : synonym of  Scabricola gilbertsoni  (original combination)
 Pterygia nebulosa : synonym of Marginella nebulosa 
 Pterygia nucella : synonym of Pterygia dactylus 
 Pterygia pudica : synonym of Strigatella pudica 
 Pterygia punctata : synonym of Imbricariopsis punctata

References

 Cernohorsky W.O. (1991). The Mitridae of the world. Part 2. The subfamily Mitrinae concluded and subfamilies Imbricariinae and Cylindromitrinae. Monographs of Marine Mollusca. 4: ii + 164 pp

External links
 Röding, P.F. (1798). Museum Boltenianum sive Catalogus cimeliorum e tribus regnis naturæ quæ olim collegerat Joa. Fried Bolten, M. D. p. d. per XL. annos proto physicus Hamburgensis. Pars secunda continens Conchylia sive Testacea univalvia, bivalvia & multivalvia. Trapp, Hamburg. viii, 199 pp
  Iredale, T. (1929). Queensland molluscan notes, No. 1. Memoirs of the Queensland Museum. 9(3): 261-297, pls 30-31
 Fedosov A., Puillandre N., Herrmann M., Kantor Yu., Oliverio M., Dgebuadze P., Modica M.V. & Bouchet P. (2018). The collapse of Mitra: molecular systematics and morphology of the Mitridae (Gastropoda: Neogastropoda). Zoological Journal of the Linnean Society. 1-85

Mitridae